Delduar is an upazila of Tangail District in the Division of Dhaka, Bangladesh.

Geography
It has 32696 households and total area 184.54 km2.

Demographics
As of the 2011 Bangladesh census, Delduar has a population of 207278. Males constitute 50.46% of the population, and females 49.54%.Delduar has an average literacy rate of 40.5% (7+ years).

Administration
Delduar Upazila is divided into eight union parishads: Atia, Delduar, Deoli, Dubail, Elashin, Fazilhati, Lauhati, and Pathrail. The union parishads are subdivided into 123 mauzas and 162 villages.

See also
Atia Mosque
Upazilas of Bangladesh
Districts of Bangladesh
Divisions of Bangladesh

References

 
Upazilas of Tangail District